Baranca River may refer to:

 Baranca, a tributary of the Siret in Suceava County, Romania
 Baranca, a tributary of the Herța in Botoșani County, Romania

See also
 Baranca (disambiguation), various villages in Romania